Paweł Zawistowski (born 11 March 1984 in Łódź) is a Polish footballer who plays as a midfielder for RKS Radomsko.

Career

Club
In June 2010, he was loaned to Arka Gdynia on a one-year deal. He was released from Arka Gdynia on 30 June 2011.

In July 2011, he moved to Zawisza Bydgoszcz.

Honours
Jagiellonia
 Polish Cup: 2009–10

References

External links
 
 

1984 births
Living people
Polish footballers
Footballers from Łódź
Association football midfielders
Znicz Pruszków players
Jagiellonia Białystok players
Arka Gdynia players
Zawisza Bydgoszcz players
Korona Kielce players
Górnik Łęczna players
Chojniczanka Chojnice players
Bytovia Bytów players
RKS Radomsko players
Ekstraklasa players
I liga players
II liga players